Belutchistania is a monotypic snout moth genus described by Hans Georg Amsel in 1951. Its single species, Belutchistania squamalis, was described by the same author. It is found in Iran and the United Arab Emirates.

References

Phycitinae
Monotypic moth genera
Moths of Asia
Taxa named by Hans Georg Amsel
Pyralidae genera